Dan Clifton (1865–1896?), known as Dynamite Dan or Dynamite Dick, was an American Old West outlaw and member of the Doolin Gang.

Clifton was a minor criminal wanted in the Oklahoma Territory for robbery, safecracking, and cattle rustling before joining the Doolin Gang in 1892. Upon joining the gang, Clifton took part in the remainder of the Doolin Gang's bank robberies, including the 1893 gunfight with law enforcement at Ingalls, Oklahoma, where three of his fingers were shot off. Following the gang's escape, and eventual disbandment, a bounty of $3,500 was placed on Clifton, who was becoming popularly known as the "most killed outlaw in America", as people would repeatedly turn in a corpse claiming the body as Clifton's, despite the fact the bodies had all 10 fingers, while others, who would randomly cut off three fingers, would often cut the wrong ones. Clifton was reportedly killed near Blackwell, Oklahoma, by Deputy US Marshal Chris Madsen in 1896. While the man in question was missing the correct fingers,  the outlaw killed was suspected to have actually been Buck McGregg. That is unlikely, though, as Clifton never surfaced again, and Madsen was said to have known Clifton.  

Actor Buck Taylor was cast as Clifton under the nickname "Dynamite Dick", instead of "Dynamite Dan", in the 1981 film, Cattle Annie and Little Britches, a fictional portrayal of teenaged Oklahoma bandits.

References

Further reading
 Sifakis, Carl. Encyclopedia of American Crime, New York, Facts On File Inc., 1982

Outlaws of the American Old West
American bank robbers
1865 births
1896 deaths
Deaths by firearm in Oklahoma
People shot dead by law enforcement officers in the United States